Mia Marianne Strömmer (born February 26, 1974 in Tampere) is a retired female hammer thrower from Finland. She set her personal best throw (69.63 metres) on March 24, 2001 in Potchefstroom. That mark was the national record until 2019.

Achievements

References

sports-reference

1974 births
Living people
Sportspeople from Tampere
Finnish female hammer throwers
Athletes (track and field) at the 2000 Summer Olympics
Olympic athletes of Finland